is a Japanese four-panel manga series written and illustrated by Tozen Ujiie. It ran in Kodansha's Magazine Special from May 2007 to June 2008. It was then transferred to Kodansha's Weekly Shōnen Magazine, where it ran from July 2008 to November 2021. Its chapters are collected and published into individual tankōbon volumes, with twenty-two volumes released as of January 2022.

An anime television series adaptation by GoHands aired in Japan between July and September 2010. A second anime season aired between January and March 2014. An anime film premiered in July 2017, and a second anime film was set to premiere in July 2020, but had been delayed to January 2021 due to the COVID-19 pandemic. In North America, the anime series has been licensed by Sentai Filmworks, and in the UK it has been licensed by MVM Entertainment.

Plot
Takatoshi Tsuda attends Ōsai Academy, a high school that, due to declining birth rates, is converted from an all-girl school to a co-ed school (with a male-to-female ratio of 28:524). On his first day, he is forcibly recruited into the student council as the vice-president and sole male representative. The story follows Tsuda and the student council as they interact with each other and their schoolmates.

Characters

Main characters
Takatoshi Tsuda

 is the main character of the story. He chooses to attend a former all-girl school simply because it is close to his home. On his first day at the school, he is forcibly recruited into the student council as the vice-president and male representative. He normally acts as the straight-man to Shino and Aria, who, along with other girls in the school, regularly make perverted comments and sexual innuendos. Eventually, he becomes so used to this behaviour that he actually feels odd when they do not make such jokes.
Shino Amakusa

 is a second-year student and the student council president. She is serious and diligent, excels in academics, and is very popular among the student body. However, she is almost always thinking perverted things. She suggests that one of her original reasons she showed an interest in Takatoshi is so that she could observe him in health and physical education classes. Although she has excellent grades and is skilled in a wide range of subjects, she fears heights and insects, and her rather flat chest makes her feel self-conscious, especially when comparing herself to Aria. She occasionally performs couple-like activities with Takatoshi such as walking with him, sharing an umbrella or clearing his earwax, but is embarrassed whenever Takatoshi says anything that could be interpreted as being romantic (as the series progresses, it is hinted she has feelings for Takatoshi, but she categorically denies this every time she is asked, and there is no romantic development between them during the series). According to her childhood friend Misaki Amano, Shino was student council president at her previous school.
Aria Shichijo

 is the student council secretary and in the same year as Shino; they are good friends. She comes from an affluent family and is the most physically mature character. However, she has a strongly perverted mind; like Shino, she has a habit of twisting every word and thought into something sexual. Because she is absurdly rich and overly pampered, she can be a social airhead: for instance, she will wait in front of a door and expect it to slide open or stand at the bottom of a staircase expecting it to be an escalator. In contrast, she is academically smart and places second in midterms for her class year, right behind Shino. Her chest is larger than Shino's, which causes the latter to feel self-conscious.
Suzu Hagimura

 is the student council treasurer and in the same year as Takatoshi. She describes herself as a returning student with an IQ of 180, can do 10-digit arithmetic calculations in her head, and is fluent in multiple languages including English. Even though she is 16 years old at the start of the series, she is no taller than an elementary school student and is very sensitive about her short stature. Many of the jokes involve her childish appearance or height and she flies into a rage whenever such subjects are mentioned. She normally acts as a secondary tsukkomi at Osai Academy, and she and Tsuda together act as tsukkomi to Shino, Aria, and Nene. Although initially reluctant to accept Takatoshi as a member of the student council, she soon becomes dependent on him, to the point of feeling uneasy when he's not around, and it is hinted on multiple occasions later in the series that she may be developing feelings for him, though, like Shino, there is no romantic development between them during the series. In situations where multiple characters are conversing, often only the top of her head is shown, or a caption and arrow points to where she is.

Supporting characters

Ranko Hata

 is the head of the school's newspaper club. She likes to take photos of the student council members to sell around the school, usually without the permission of those being photographed, and she often gets caught. When she conducts an interview, she likes to twist the responses to something dirty or perverted, with Tsuda as a frequent target; running gags in the series have her constantly trying to get Shino and Takatoshi to admit that they are dating, or her admitting to spreading rumors about it, much to their chagrin. She is expressionless most of the time (but has been shown to smile on very rare occasions) and has a deadpan monotone voice in the anime, which strongly contrasts with the other girls' excitable temperaments.
Mutsumi Mitsuba

 is Takatoshi's classmate who forms a judo club at the start of the series. She is dedicated to leading her club but is also simple-minded. She develops a crush on Takatoshi later in the series and, despite her remarkable potential and drive regarding martial arts, states that her dream is to simply become a bride. In one instance, she combines his family name  with her given name . Because of her innocent nature, she often misses Aria and Shino's innuendos.
Naruko Yokoshima

 is a teacher at Ōsai Academy and the student council adviser. She is even more perverted than Aria and Shino and aggressively seeks out younger guys, not excepting her male students. In the anime, she teaches English and, true to form, her syllabus almost always contains perverted content. She is perceived to be unreliable by the council members and useless as an educator.
Kotomi Tsuda

 is Takatoshi's younger sister, who is in her final year of middle school at the beginning of the series and attends Ōsai the following year. A cheerful girl, she is considerate and caring toward others, but is curious and enthusiastic about sexual matters - something she has in common with the title character in Ujiie's previous work . In one episode, when Takatoshi was sick, both she and Shino brought him adult manga. She is very close with her brother but, to Takatoshi's chagrin, her comments sometimes imply that they have an incestuous relationship, and she has also made comments that suggest she is a chūnibyō. She gets along very well with the other girls and often asks for and gets help from them. She eventually becomes the manager for the Judo club.
Kaede Igarashi

 is the head of the disciplinary committee at Ōsai Academy. She has a strong sense of justice and morals, but has an extreme fear of boys. This ends up being an issue because the school became co-ed after she enrolled. As the series progresses, her androphobia lessens to a point: she is at ease when around Takatoshi, but not other men.
Sayaka Dejima

 is Aria's personal maid. She is very protective of Aria and bears the key to her chastity belt. She has a fetish for anything that Aria has touched or worn, as well as unwashed underwear in general.
Nene Todoroki

 is Suzu's friend and a member of the Robot Research Club. She is as perverted as the rest of the girls, as she often wears a vibrator during school hours or is seen working on such devices at her club.
Kaoru Toki

 is Kotomi's first high school friend. Even though Toki looks and sounds like a delinquent, she is actually clumsy and shows no signs of a rebellious nature. The only reason she leaves her shirt loose is because she once accidentally tucked it inside her underwear and was embarrassed about it. She is a bit scatterbrained as she has a tendency to get lost and arrive late when meeting up with Kotomi. Her full name is revealed in the credits of the Seitokai Yakuindomo: The Movie.
Chihiro Uomi

 nicknamed "Womi",  is the student council president of nearby Eiryou High School. She is introduced when her school visits Ōsai to exchange ideas. She and Shino discover they are much alike in thought and personality and thus they get along. She and Tsuda become in-laws of a sort when their respective cousins marry (Tsuda is the groom's cousin, Uomi is the bride's). Afterwards, she insists that Takatoshi call her Onee-chan and she addresses him as Taka-kun. She seems to view Takatoshi as a potential romantic interest, much to the consternation of some of the other girls; however, there is no romantic development between them.
Nozomi Mori

  is a second year student at Eriyou High School and the vice president of its student council, effectively making her Eriyou's equivalent of Takatoshi. Like Takatoshi and Suzu, she is the straight man on the Eriyou Student Council. She finds her opposite number from Ōsai pleasant to be around, as neither of them have to be the straight man.

Crossover characters
Characters from Ujiie's previous works have made appearances in Seitokai. Being in the same class as Shino in elementary school they both are of the same age with Amano now also being a high school student, although both of them went to different high schools. Like Takatoshi, she acts as a tsukkomi for Shino's various jokes. The idol unit Triple Booking from Ujiie's work  also make appearances.

Media

Manga
Seitokai Yakuindomo is written and illustrated by Tozen Ujiie. The manga was first serialized in Kodansha's Magazine Special from May 19, 2007, to June 20, 2008. The series was then transferred to Kodansha's Weekly Shōnen Magazine, where it ran from July 23, 2008, to November 17, 2021. The first tankōbon volume was released on August 12, 2008, under Kodansha's Shōnen Magazine KC imprint. Its twenty-second and final volume was released on January 17, 2022.

Volume list

Anime

A 13-episode anime television series produced by GoHands and directed by Hiromitsu Kanazawa aired in Japan from July 4 to September 26, 2010 on TV Kanagawa. The anime began airing at later dates on Chiba TV, TV Saitama, Sun TV, KBS, Tokyo MX, TV Aichi, and AT-X. Two pieces of theme music are used for the anime: one opening theme and one ending theme. Six Blu-ray/DVD volumes were released between August 4 and October 27, 2010. 

A 13-episode second season titled  aired from January 4 to March 29, 2014. It was simulcast with English subtitles by Crunchyroll. An anime film was released on July 21, 2017. Both seasons and the film have been licensed in the US by Sentai Filmworks and in the UK by MVM Entertainment, and released on Blu-ray on December 10, 2019, and October 18, 2021, respectively. A second anime film was set to be released on July 10, 2020, but was delayed to January 1, 2021 due to the COVID-19 pandemic. The staff and cast returned to reprise their roles in both films. The second movie was released on Blu-ray by Sentai Filmworks on September 20, 2022.

Original video animation (OVA) episodes of the anime have been shipping with the limited editions of the manga volumes, beginning with the fifth volume released on April 15, 2011, and excluding the sixteenth, twenty-first and twenty-second volumes. The OVAs were released with limited edition bundles of the manga and also as standalone videos. They were also produced by GoHands and their episodes are numbered as if they continued the TV series. The sixteenth volume instead bundled the first movie. The twenty-first volume bundled the second movie.

An Internet radio show titled  produced by Animate TV began streaming online on July 14, 2010 to support the TV series. The show does not have any fixed hosts, but members of the voice cast take turns hosting the show every week.

Notes

Works cited
 "Ch." is shortened form for chapter and refers to a chapter number of the Seitokai Yakuindomo manga by Tozen Ujiie. Original Japanese version published by Kodansha. "Ch. p" references to chapters published in Magazine Special, while those without the "p" refer to chapters published in Weekly Shonen Magazine.

References

External links
 Manga official website 
 Anime official website 
 Seitokai Yakuindomo * at Crunchyroll 
 

2010 anime television series debuts
2014 anime television series debuts
2007 manga
Anime postponed due to the COVID-19 pandemic
Anime series based on manga
Comedy anime and manga
GoHands
Japanese high school television series
Kodansha manga
School life in anime and manga
Sentai Filmworks
Shōnen manga
Slice of life anime and manga
Tokyo MX original programming